The Texas Lottery is the government-operated lottery available throughout Texas. It is operated by the Texas Lottery Commission, headquartered in downtown Austin, Texas.

History
House Bill 54 was introduced for a state lottery on July 11, 1991. The voters of Texas approved an amendment to the Texas Constitution November 5, 1991 authorizing lottery sales in Texas.

The Texas Lottery Commission created an unusual contest for the Lottery logo: designs from a contracted advertising agency were pitted against designs from the general public. One logo from each source was placed in head-to-head competition, and the winning logo, a cowboy hat thrown high in celebration (still in current use) was the public design. The winner was Susan Holten, from Carrollton.

The lottery's first game was the scratch game Lone Star Millions, with the first ticket sold to then Gov. Ann Richards at Polk's Feed Store in Oak Hill on May 29, 1992. First-day sales of 23.2 million tickets sets a then-world record. First-week sales ending June 5 set another world record, with over 102 million tickets.

Lotto Texas began sales on November 7, 1992, with the first drawing on November 14 and the first jackpot won by a resident of Schulenburg on November 28.

The Texas Lottery Commission was formed via legislation in 1993 to take over management of the Lottery from the Texas Comptroller of Public Accounts; the legislation also gives the Commission oversight of charitable bingo games (moving that duty from the Texas Alcoholic Beverage Commission).

By November 1993, Texas Lottery sales would exceed $1 billion, breaking a record set by the Florida Lottery in 1989.

Texas joined the Mega Millions consortium in 2003, with sales beginning December 3 and the first drawing to include Texas on December 5. Though no Texas ticket won the jackpot, one Texas-bought ticket matched the first five numbers for $175,000. The first Texas jackpot winner of Mega Millions was not until the drawing of October 4, 2004; a Carrollton player took home the $101 million (annuity value) prize.

As part of the cross-selling arrangement between the operators of Mega Millions and Powerball, the Texas Lottery Commission agreed to begin selling Powerball tickets on January 31, 2010; the first drawing including Texas was three days later.

On April 23, 2013, the House voted not to recommission the Texas Lottery Commission, which would have potentially brought an end to the lottery in Texas. Later in the day, the House reversed course with a new vote on the bill.

Joan R. Ginther became a four-time winner of prizes over $1 million from 1993 to 2010, first from Lotto Texas and subsequently three times from scratch tickets. All of her winning tickets were purchased in Texas, and two of them were bought from the same convenience store in Bishop.

Revenue allocation
In the 2018 fiscal year, lottery revenue was allocated as follows.
 65 percent is paid out in prizes.
 25 percent is paid to the Foundation School Fund, which is administered by the Texas Education Agency to support public education in Texas.
 5 percent is paid to retailers as commissions.
 3 percent is retained to cover administration costs.
 2 percent is transferred to the Texas Legislature for allocation. Since 2009 this money has gone to the Texas Fund for Veterans Assistance and other state programs. This revenue includes that from unclaimed prizes and from sales of scratch ticket games such as Veterans Cash.

Prior to the 2018 fiscal year, the Texas Lottery Commission paid retailers a bonus for selling top-prize tickets for in-house draw games and for scratch tickets winning $1 million or higher. This program has been discontinued as of September 1, 2018.

General rules
As with most US lotteries, players must be at least 18 years of age.

Winning tickets must be claimed within 180 days or the prize is forfeited. For scratch tickets, the time limit begins when a game is closed by the Commission; for drawings the time limit begins the date of the drawing.

Within Texas, players must choose the cash value option (CVO) or annual pay (AP) when purchasing Powerball, Mega Millions, and/or Lotto Texas tickets when playing, instead of after winning (see below).

Current games

Scratch tickets
The Texas Lottery began operations on May 29, 1992 with sales of Lone Star Millions. By the game's end on February 1, 2004, it set a world record for first-day sales (23.2 million tickets) and first-week sales (102.4 million tickets), There were 6 prizes of $1 million (annuity-only) and 479 of $10,000 each.

Scratch tickets, most changing frequently, cost $1 to $100 each. The Texas Lottery is the only U.S. lottery to offer $100 scratch-off tickets.

Prizes have included not only cash (from $1 to the millions), and free tickets (which can be used to purchase any Texas drawing game), but also trucks, tickets to sports events, and tours of Cowboys Stadium.

In-house drawings

Lotto Texas
Lotto Texas was the first Texas in-house drawing game offered, with sales beginning on November 7, 1992; its first drawing on November 14, 1992, and the first jackpot won on November 28, 1992. By its first anniversary, the Texas Lottery sold over $1 billion in tickets.

Initially sold as an annuity-only game (no cash option), the purchaser having to pick numbers, and the drawings held only on Saturdays, Lotto Texas later added the "Quick Pick" option (random selection of numbers, added on May 29, 1993, the Lottery's first anniversary), the "Cash Value" option (CVO), and changed the drawings to twice weekly, adding Wednesdays.

Among notable winners was Thomas "Hollywood" Henderson, the former Dallas Cowboys linebacker, who claimed a winning jackpot in excess of $14 million in 2000.

The current format utilizes 54 balls drawn from a machine; players choose 6 numbers. The jackpot is paid either in 30 annual payments, or in lump sum (discussed further below). Non-jackpot payments are in lump sum. Each game costs $1, the minimum jackpot is $5 million, and drawings are held at 10:12 PM Central time on Wednesdays and Saturdays. Lotto Texas expanded with a Monday drawing, started in August 23, 2021.

Lotto Texas made the Extra! option available to players on April 14, 2013, with the first drawing to include Extra! winnings being held on April 17, 2013.  The Extra! option costs $1 more per play.  This gives players the chance to win $2 for matching 2 of 6 numbers.  The Extra! option also adds $10 to the base prize amount for matching 3 of 6 numbers, $100 to the base prize for matching 4 of 6 numbers, and $10,000 to the base prize for matching 5 of 6 numbers.  No change is made to the jackpot prize amount.

Overall odds of winning are 1:71.  Overall odds of winning are 1:7.9 with the Extra! option.

Texas Two Step
Texas Two Step is the other twice-weekly in-house game in Texas. Sales for Texas Two Step began on May 13, 2001.

The current format utilizes a 4+1 matrix using two sets of numbers 1 through 35. Players choose five numbers; four from the first set of 35 white balls, and the fifth, Bonus Ball, from a set of 35 red balls. All payments, including the jackpot, are in lump sum. Each game is $1, the minimum jackpot is $200,000, and drawings are held at 10:12 PM on Mondays and Thursdays.

Overall odds of winning are 1:32.4.

Texas Two-Step's jackpot always is paid in lump sum; as such, it is the only Texas Lottery jackpot game not to require players to choose cash or annuity when playing (see below.)

All or Nothing
Introduced in 2012, All or Nothing is drawn 24 times weekly, at 10:00 am, 12:27 pm, 6:00 pm, and 10:12 pm Central Time Mondays through Saturdays. Players choose (or let the lottery terminal select) 12 numbers from a field of 24. A player wins $250,000 cash if either all 12 numbers match those drawn or if none match the numbers drawn (the top prize has a $5 million liability limit on all drawings on this game). The odds of either way of winning the top prize are the same; the first ball drawn determines whether a player must match all the numbers, or none, to win the top prize. Other prizes are $500, $50, $10, and $2; players win either by matching at least eight numbers or no more than four. Each play is $2.

Each number set on an All or Nothing playslip has boxes for quick pick and for multi-draw, where a player may select to use the same numbers for up to 24 consecutive drawings.

The All or Nothing concept and format has subsequently been adopted by other state lotteries.

Cash Five
Cash Five is a daily-draw game. Sales for this game (which replaced a similarly named game, Cash 5) began on July 29, 2002. On Sept. 23, 2018, Cash Five relaunched with a new matrix, better overall odds of winning and guaranteed prizes, including a $25,000 top prize. The first drawing with the new rules in place was on Sept. 24, 2018.

The current format utilizes one set of 35 balls; players choose five numbers. All payments are in lump sum. Each game costs $1; and drawings are held at 10:12 PM Central time Mondays through Saturdays.

Overall odds of winning are 1:7.2

Pick 3
Pick 3 is a four times daily draw game. It began on October 25, 1993.

The current format utilizes three sets of digits 0 through 9. Players choose: exact order (all three digits), any order (two or three digits), exact and any order (two or three digits) and combo (two or three digits; combo two is the same as two exact order plays while combo three is the same as three or six exact order plays).

All payments are in lump sum. Exact or any order bets cost $0.50 or $1; exact and any order for $1, combo (two digits cost $1.50 or $3; three digits cost $3 or $6). The prizes are guaranteed amounts, and drawings are held four times a day, at 10:00 AM, 12:27 PM, 6:00 PM, and 10:12 PM Central time Mondays through Saturdays.

Daily 4
Daily 4 also is drawn 24 times weekly. Sales began on September 30, 2007.

Daily 4 is played as in Pick 3, except there are 4 digits. Players can select: Straight (all four digits in exact order), Box (all four digits in any order), Straight/Box (all four digits), Pairs [two of the four digits in exact order, which can be: front pair (first two digits), middle pair (middle digits), or back pair (last two digits)], Combo [which can be: 4-way (three of the four digits drawn are identical, such as 1112), 6-way (the digits drawn are two pairs, such as 1122), 12-way (two of the four digits drawn are identical, such as 1123) and or 24-way (all four digits are different, such as 1234)].

All payments are in lump sum. Players can select Straight or Box for either $0.50 or $1; Straight/Box for $1; Pairs for $0.50 or $1; Combo (4-way for $2 or $4; 6-way for $3 or $6; 12-way for $6 or $12; or 24-way for $12 or $24). The prizes are guaranteed amounts, and drawings are held at 10:00 AM, 12:27 PM, 6:00 PM, and 10:12 PM Central time Mondays through Saturdays.

Fireball
In April 28th, 2019, the Lottery replaced the Sum It-Up with the new Fireball option. The Fireball is an add-on to the Pick 3, and Daily 4 games. Activating the Fireball feature doubles the cost of the play.

After the Pick 3 and Daily 4 numbers are drawn, one digit 0 through 9 is drawn and designated as the Fireball number (The fireball number is separate from pick 3 and daily 4). The Fireball number may then be used by the player to replace any one digit in the Pick 3 and Daily 4 numbers. For instance, if the player selects 123 in the Pick 3 game, and the number actually drawn is 124, but the Fireball is a 3, the player may replace the 4 with a 3 to create a winning combination.

Because the Fireball creates additional ways to win, a win using the Fireball generally pays a lesser amount than a win using the base play, however, a player can win both from the Fireball and from the base play if the Fireball matches one of the digits naturally.

Multi-jurisdictional drawings

Mega Millions

In 2003, the Texas Lottery joined the Mega Millions consortium.

The current format utilizes one set of 70 white balls, and a second set, of 25 yellow balls (the "Mega Ball".) Players choose six numbers; five white ball numbers, and the "Mega Ball" from the second set. Jackpots are paid in either 30 graduated annual payments, or in cash; see below on jackpot choices. Non-jackpot payments are in lump sum. Each game costs $2, the minimum jackpot is $40 million, and drawings are held at 10:00 PM Central time on Tuesdays and Fridays.

Texas, as in all Mega Millions jurisdictions except for California, offers an option, called Megaplier (similar to Powerball's Power Play) which multiplies non-jackpot prizes by either 2, 3, 4, or 5. Second prize (5+0), normally $1 million, can be quintupled, to $5 million cash, if Megaplier was chosen. Texas is among the jurisdictions that offer a feature called “just the jackpot”. For $3, a player selects 2 sets of numbers which qualify for the jackpot only. “Just the jackpot” wagers are not eligible for other payouts that are offered in the game though the player is required to make the jackpot choice if either set matches all 6 numbers to win the jackpot.

Powerball

On October 13, 2009, the Mega Millions consortium and MUSL (the operator of Powerball, the other major US lottery game) reached an agreement in principle for lotteries, at their option, to cross-sell Mega Millions and Powerball; the earliest date agreed on was January 31, 2010.

The Texas Lottery Commission elected to participate in the agreement; on November 17, 2009 voted to publish Powerball rules for public comment. On December 14, 2009 the Commission held a public hearing, receiving comments on the proposal to join Powerball.

On January 6, 2010, the Commission voted 3-0 to join Powerball. Texas sales for the game began on January 31, 2010; the first drawing including Texas was conducted three days later.

The current format utilizes one set of 69 white balls, and a second set, of 26 red balls (the "Powerball".) Players choose six numbers; five white ball numbers, and the "Powerball” from the second set. Jackpots are paid in either 30 graduated annual payments, or in cash; see below on jackpot choices. Non-jackpot payments are in lump sum. Each game costs $2, the minimum jackpot is $40 million, and drawings are held at 10:12 P.M Central time following the in state drawings that take place on Mondays Wednesdays and Saturdays.

Former draw games

Texas Triple Chance
Texas Triple Chance was a $2 game featuring a $100,000 top prize, with play beginning on September 28, 2015. Players would select 7 numbers from 1 to 55 (or quick pick). In addition to that set, a player received two extra sets, both quick picks. Ten numbers were drawn. To win, a player had to match by a horizontal set. Texas Triple Chance drawings were held Monday through Saturday at 10:12 p.m. Central Time. The game ended after the July 28, 2018 drawing.

Monopoly Millionaires' Club 

Monopoly Millionaires' Club (MMC) began sales on October 19, 2014; it was drawn Fridays. Plays were $5 each. Players chose 5 of 52 numbers; a sixth number, from a field of 28 (automatically quick-picked), also represented one of the properties on a U.S. Monopoly game board.

Texas suspended sales of MMC following the December 12, 2014 drawing and the remaining 22 participants voted to suspend Monopoly Millionaires' Club after the December 26 draw.

MMC was tied to a television game show, which continued airing until April 2016.

Jackpot choice 
Texas Lottery regulations require the players to choose either cash value option (CVO) or annual payment (AP) on the lottery playslips at the ticket sales for Texas Lotto, Powerball, and MegaMillions. If the choice isn't marked on the playslip, it is rejected until the correction is made. Texas Lottery does not allow the players to change their choices after the ticket sales.

The games such as Texas Two Step, Pick 3, Daily 4, Cash Five, and All or Nothing are paid in lump sum only.

See also

Gambling in Texas
Lotteries in the United States

References

External links
 Texas Lottery site

State lotteries of the United States
State agencies of Texas
Economy of Texas